was a Japanese samurai of the mid-Edo period who was the founder of the Hitotsubashi-Tokugawa family, one of the Gosankyō, the three lesser branches of the Tokugawa family. He was the fourth son of Tokugawa Yoshimune, the eighth shōgun with his concubine, Oume no Kata. He is the grandfather of Tokugawa Ienari the eleventh shōgun, His child-hood name was "Kogoro" (小五郎) and when Oume died at 1721, he was raised by his grandmother, Joenin until her death 1726 and later he was raised by Okume no Kata, Yoshimune's concubine.

Family
 Father: Tokugawa Yoshimune
 Mother: Oume no Kata later Shinshin'in (1700–1721)
Adopted Mother: Okume no Kata later Kakuju-in (1697-1777)
 Wife, Children, Concubines:
 Wife: Ichijo Akiko later Fushin'in
 Matsudaira Shigemasa
 Concubine: ???
 Sennosuke
 Kanejirō
 Concubine: Oyuka no Kata
 Matsudaira Shigetomi
 Yasuhime (1747-1769) married Shimazu Shigehide
 Tokugawa Harusada (1751-1827)
 Kuroda Haruyuki (1753-1781)
 Kenzaburo

Ancestry

References

 Nekhet's "World Nobility" page on the Hitotsubashi-Tokugawa
 Hitotsubashi genealogy

1721 births
1765 deaths
Tokugawa clan